Alim Sherzamonov is a politician in Tajikistan.

On June 16, 2014, individuals who identified themselves as Tajikistan government security officials apprehended Alex Sodiqov, a Political Science PhD candidate at the University of Toronto, during an interview with Sherzamanov.

Sherzamonov is credited with playing a leadership role during political unrest in Khorog, the capital of the autonomous republic of Gorno-Badakhshan, in 2012. Human Rights Watch describes Sherzamonov as a "civil society activist".
Academics at the University of Exeter would say Sodiqov was interviewing Sherzamonov as part of a study of failures of conflict management in former Republics of the Soviet Union.

The whistleblower organization WikiLeaks published a diplomatic cable from United States Ambassador Tracey A. Jacobson, which said Sherzamonov was the "local representative of the Social Democratic Party".
Jacobson reported that Sherzamonov had played a role in getting protesters to disperse.

Kirgizbek Kanunov, writing in CACI Analyst asserted that Tajikistan's National Security Committee, the KNB, had described Sodiqov as an agent for a foreign government, who was negotiating with Sherzamonov on their behalf.
CTV News reported Sherzamonov claimed security officials had planned to arrest him, as well.

Global Voices, a site Sodiqov has contributed to, reported that Security Officials had broadcast footage of Sodiqov, that seemed intended to discredit Sheramonov.

Sherzamonov has acknowledged playing a role in demonstrations during the summer of 2012, but he insists his role was peaceful and non-violent.

References

Living people
Year of birth missing (living people)
Place of birth missing (living people)
Tajikistani politicians